Jeff Baran is an American attorney who has served as a member of the Nuclear Regulatory Commission (NRC) since October 14, 2014. In September 2017, he was renominated by President Donald Trump to another five-year term on the NRC. Prior to joining the NRC, Baran served on the staff of the United States House Committee on Oversight and Government Reform and was senior counsel to the United States House Committee on Energy and Commerce, advising ranking member Henry Waxman.

References

External links
 Biography at the Nuclear Regulatory Commission

Living people
Ohio University alumni
Harvard Law School alumni
21st-century American lawyers
Obama administration personnel
Trump administration personnel
Year of birth missing (living people)
Biden administration personnel